Sander Gillé and Joran Vliegen were the defending champions but chose not to defend their title.

Markus Eriksson and André Göransson won the title after defeating Ivan Gakhov and Alexander Pavlioutchenkov 6–3, 3–6, [10–7] in the final.

Seeds

Draw

References
 Main Draw

Tampere Open - Men's Doubles
2018 Men's Doubles